George Clayes (1831 – March 3, 1888) was an American-born farmer, merchant and political figure in Quebec. He represented Missisquoi in the House of Commons of Canada from 1887 to 1888 as a Liberal member.

He was born in New Hampshire, the son of the Reverend Dana Clayes, and came to Bedford, Canada East with his uncle in 1846. In 1850, he went to Cleveland, Ohio, where he entered business as a merchant. He then went to Omaha, Nebraska, where he served as a member of the territorial legislature. In 1866, Clayes returned to Bedford. He married his cousin Sophia Clayes in 1855. Clayes was an unsuccessful candidate for a seat in the House of Commons in 1878 and 1882. He died in office at the age of 57.

References 

The Canadian parliamentary companion, 1887 AJ Gemmill

1831 births
1888 deaths
Anglophone Quebec people
American emigrants to pre-Confederation Quebec
Members of the Nebraska Territorial Legislature
Candidates in the 1878 Canadian federal election
Candidates in the 1882 Canadian federal election
Members of the House of Commons of Canada from Quebec
Liberal Party of Canada MPs
19th-century American politicians
People from Montérégie